Ostashevskaya is a rural locality (a village) in Sibirskoye Rural Settlement, Verkhovazhsky District, Vologda Oblast, Russia. The population was 79 as of 2002.

Geography 
Ostashevskaya is located 42 km southeast of Verkhovazhye (the district's administrative centre) by road. Voronikha is the nearest rural locality.

References 

Rural localities in Verkhovazhsky District